The Washington State University Alumni Association defines an alumnus as anyone who was a student at WSU and is no longer attending.  This page lists accomplished alumni and faculty members of WSU.

Nobel Laureates
Irwin Rose, 1948, 2004 Nobel Prize in Chemistry winner for research in immune defense and proteins; discoveries may lead to development of drugs to combat Parkinson's and Alzheimer's disease, cystic fibrosis, and cervical cancer; first year of undergraduate study was at WSU; received WSU Regents' Distinguished Alumnus Award in 2005
Mario Vargas Llosa, recipient of 2010 Nobel Prize in literature, visiting faculty, 1968-69
Norman Borlaug, Nobel Peace Prize, 1970, recipient for “Green Revolution”, honorary doctorate recipient from WSU.

Notable alumni

Academe
Judith A. Bense,  academic; president of University of West Florida
Howard Bowen, 1929 B.A. economics, 1933 M.A. economics, former president of Claremont University Center, University of Iowa, Grinnell College  and American Association of Higher Education; received WSU Regents' Distinguished Alumnus Award in 1965
David Comer, consultant in field of circuit design for IBM, Intel, Lawrence Livermore National Labs, and Mobility Systems Inc.
Gordon G. Gallup, psychologist at University at Albany's Psychology Department in biopsychology program
Weldon Gibson, 1938 B.A. business administration, executive vice president of Stanford Research Institute; received WSU Regents' Distinguished Alumnus Award in 1979
Henry Heald, 1923 B.S. civil engineering, president of Ford Foundation, New York University, Illinois Institute of Technology, and American Society for Engineering Education; received WSU Regents' Distinguished Alumnus Award in 1962
W. Hudson Kensel, historian of American West 
David Miller,  Seattle architect; co-founder of Miller/Hull Partnership; architecture professor at University of Washington; chair of UW Department of Architecture 2007–15
George B. Thomas, former professor of mathematics at MIT; best known for being author of widely used calculus textbook
Jon Wefald, former president of Kansas State University

Animal husbandry
Helen Elaine Freeman, conservationist and endangered species advocate; specialized in saving snow leopards
Ivan Peterson, 1942 D.V.M., member of Alpha Tau Omega; president of Sphinx Club and of Crimson Court; veterinarian in California; worked with television series Lassie; friend to Jane Goodall and helped sponsor her chimpanzee research; died in 1967

The arts, literature and media
Sherman Alexie, 1994 B.A. American studies, author and filmmaker; received WSU Regents' Distinguished Alumnus Award in 2003
Rudy Autio, sculptor, best known for figurative ceramic vessels
Cindy Brunson, 1996 B.A. communications/broadcasting, ESPN anchor, Pac-12 Networks commentator
Ana Cabrera, 2004 B.A. communications, CNN reporter and anchor
Betty Feves, artist
Deborah Gardner, Peace Corps volunteer murdered in Tonga in 1976; subject of American Taboo by Philip Weiss
Art Gilmore, 1931, voice actor and announcer
Keith Jackson, 1954 B.A. sports communications, ABC-TV sports commentator; received WSU Regents' Distinguished Alumnus Award in 1978
Edward Kienholz, pop art installation artist
Gary Larson, 1972 B.A. communications, Far Side cartoonist; received WSU Regents' Distinguished Alumnus Award in 1990
 Blake Lewis, American Idol Season 6 runner-up
Dolph Lundgren, Swedish actor, studied chemical engineering for a year at Washington State
Scott MacDonald, television actor
Patrick F. McManus, outdoor humor writer; studied at Washington State College before it became Washington State University
Edward R. Murrow, 1930 B.A. speech, journalist for CBS; "father of television news broadcasting"; WWII radio correspondent; Hear It Now radio program host; See It Now television program host; received WSU Regents' Distinguished Alumnus Award in 1963
Barry Serafin, 1986 B.A. humanities, ABC News correspondent; received WSU Regents' Distinguished Alumnus Award in 1991
D. C. Simpson, creator of webcomic Ozy and Millie and political cartoon I Drew This
Clyfford Still, 1935 MFA, abstract expressionist painter,
Frances Yeend, lyric soprano opera singer
Krist Novoselic, 2016 B.S. social sciences, founding member and bassist for grunge band Nirvana

Business
Paul Allen, 1977 (1973–75), co-founder of Microsoft; owner of Vulcan Enterprises, Seattle Seahawks and Portland Trail Blazers; philanthropist; received WSU Regents' Distinguished Alumnus Award in 1999
Scott E. Carson, B.A. business administration, president and CEO of Boeing Commercial Airlines
Clint Cole, co-founder of Heartstream, creator of first automatic external defibrillator (AED) for commercial use; co-founder of Digilent, a Pullman electronics manufacturer
J. Patrick Foley, 1955 B.A. education, president of Hyatt Hotels Corporation (1978–1984); chief executive officer of Braniff Airlines (1984–1988); served as chairman, president and chief executive officer of DHL Corporation Inc./DHL Airways Inc. (1988–1999)
Jamie Kern Lima, 1999 B.A. business administration, co-founder of IT Cosmetics
Robert L. Phillips, 1976 B.A. economics and B.A. mathematics.  Author, entrepreneur and professor.
Mark Suwyn, 1967 Ph.D. inorganic chemistry, CEO of NewPage Corp.; former chair and CEO of Louisiana-Pacific Corp., 1996–2004; former executive at International Paper and E.I. DuPont; member and former chair of WSU Foundation Board of Trustees
Nick Huzar, 1999 B.A. MIS. CEO of OfferUp

Government, law and politics
Svend Auken, 1962, Danish politician, Minister of Environmental Affairs 1993–2001
John Folger, 1914 B.S. horticulture, 1917 M.S. horticulture, US Ambassador to Belgium 1957–59;  member of board of governors of New York Stock Exchange;  president of Investment Bankers Association of America; chaired GOP National Finance Committee; received WSU Regents' Distinguished Alumnus Award in 1963
Walt Horan, politician; Republican member of United States House of Representatives for ten terms
Mike Lowry, 1962 B.A. general studies, former Governor of Washington
Jim Moeller, politician from Washington,  serves in Washington State House of Representatives representing 49th Legislative District
Sid Morrison, 1954 B.S. horticulture, US Congressman, 1981–93, Washington's 4th District 
Patty Murray, 1972 B.A. physical education, US Senator representing Washington
Marshall Neill, 1936 B.A. political science, Federal district court judge; Washington State Supreme Court judge; received WSU Regents' Distinguished Alumnus Award in 1979
George Nethercutt, 1967 B.A. English, US Congressman, 1995–2005
Sam Reed, 2000–2013 Washington Secretary of State
Robert A. Roe, Democrat representing New Jersey in US House of Representatives for over 23 years

Humanities
Gary J. Coleman, general authority of the Church of Jesus Christ of Latter-day Saints
Anthony Curcio, 2004 social sciences, author and youth speaker; athlete; became notorious criminal known as D.B. Tuber after masterminding armored car robbery; has since devoted life to educating youth on drug addiction
Timothy Leary, 1946 M.S. psychology
Laurence Peter, 1963 Ed.D., co-author of international best seller The Peter Principle: Why Things Go Wrong; author of three sequels, The Peter Prescription, The Peter Plan, and The Peter Pyramid; received WSU Regents' Distinguished Alumnus Award in 1980
William Julius Wilson, 1966 Ph.D. sociology, wrote The Truly Disadvantaged: The Inner City, the Underclass and Public Policy and The Declining Significance of Race; one of nine people to receive National Medal of Science; received WSU Regents' Distinguished Alumnus Award in 1988

Military
Robert Higgins, 1957 B.S. pharmacy, navy rear admiral, deputy surgeon general, and Medical Corps chief; received WSU Regents' Distinguished Alumnus Award in 2002
Charles Ross Greening, 1936 B.S. Fine Arts, colonel in US Air Force; captained the Hari Kari-er in the Doolittle Raid of Japan
James Fleming, colonel in US Air Force; helicopter pilot; Medal of Honor recipient for life-saving actions at Duc Co, South Vietnam in 1968
Dale Noyd, decorated captain and fighter pilot in US Air Force who gained worldwide attention when he became conscientious objector to protest Vietnam War
Sigmund R. Petersen, 1961 B.S. in civil engineering, rear admiral in National Oceanic and Atmospheric Administration Commissioned Officer Corps (NOAA Corps); fourth director of NOAA Corps (1990–1995)
Ronald J. Shurer II, 2001 B.A. Business Administration, Staff Sergeant and US Army Special Forces Medic. Recipient of the Medal of Honor for actions in the Battle of Shok Valley, 2008 in Afghanistan.

Science, space and technology
John Abelson, 1960 B.S. physics, co-founder and president of Agouron Pharmaceuticals; through rational drug design developed Viracept, leading drug used for controlling HIV infections, which cut death rate in half among AIDS patients in the mid-1990s; nephew of Philip Abelson and Neva Abelson; received the WSU Regents' Distinguished Alumnus Award in 2004
Neva Abelson, 1934 B.S. chemistry, developed blood test for Rh disease; wife of Philip Abelson; received WSU Regents' Distinguished Alumnus Award in 1989
Philip Abelson, 1933 B.S. chemistry, 1935 M.S. physics, "father of the nuclear-fueled submarine"; Manhattan Project participant; editor of Science; husband of Neva Abelson; received WSU Regents' Distinguished Alumnus Award in 1962
Gary L. Bennett, scientist and engineer, specializing in aerospace and energy
Jacob Bigeleisen, 1941 M.S. chemistry, founder of modern school of isotope chemistry; Manhattan Project participant; researcher at Brookhaven National Laboratory; vice president for research, dean of Graduate Studies and chemistry professor at State University of New York at Stony Brook; received WSU Regents' Distinguished Alumnus Award in 1983
William A. Bugge, 1922 B.S. civil engineering, Washington director of highways 1949–63; project director for design and construction of Bay Area Rapid Transit (BART) System in San Francisco; received WSU Regents' Distinguished Alumnus Award in 1980
Clint Cole, co-founder of Heartstream, creator of first automatic external defibrillator (AED) for commercial use; co-founder of Digilent, a Pullman electronics manufacturer
John Fabian, 1962 B.S. mechanical engineering, NASA astronaut; received WSU Regents' Distinguished Alumnus Award in 1983
 Hary Gunarto, 1988 Ph.D. electrical & computer engineering, Professor Emeritus of Ritsumeikan Asia Pacific University, Japan
 Sharon Hillier, 1982 Ph.D. Bacteriology and Public Health, faculty member of University of Pittsburgh Medical Center
Charles Glen King, 1918 B.S. chemistry, leading authority on Vitamin C; received WSU Regents' Distinguished Alumnus Award in 1964
Simon S. Lam, 1969 B.S. electrical engineering, 2004 ACM SIGCOMM Award winner; member of National Academy of Engineering
Krist Novoselic, 2016 B.S social science; former bassist from punk rock band Nirvana & Sweet 75; FAA licensed Pilot
Wajih Owais, Jordanian professor and researcher; chairman of board of directors of King Abdullah University Hospital;t President of Jordan University of Science and Technology
Martin Pall, professor emeritus of biochemistry and basic medical sciences, specializing in Chronic Fatigue Syndrome and multiple chemical sensitivity
Irwin Rose, 1948, 2004 Nobel Prize in Chemistry winner for research in immune defense and proteins; discoveries may lead to development of drugs to combat Parkinson's and Alzheimer's disease, cystic fibrosis, and cervical cancer; first year of undergraduate study was at WSU; received WSU Regents' Distinguished Alumnus Award in 2005
Karl Sax, 1916 B.S. horticulture, radiation biologist and geneticist; received WSU Regents' Distinguished Alumnus Award in 1966
Melissa Skala, 2002 B.S., cancer researcher and Professor of Biomedical Engineering at the Morgridge Institute for Research
Edmund Schweitzer, 1977 Ph.D. electrical engineering, founder of Schweitzer Engineering Laboratories
Orville Vogel, 1939 Ph.D. agronomy, wheat breeder whose findings sparked "Green Revolution"; received WSU Regents' Distinguished Alumnus Award in 1977
Allan Wilson, 1957 M.S. zoology, evolutionist; received WSU Regents' Distinguished Alumnus Award in 1990

Sports and athletics
Hamza Abdullah, former NFL safety for Denver Broncos, Cleveland Browns, and Arizona Cardinals
Husain Abdullah, former National Football League (NFL) strong safety for Minnesota Vikings and Kansas City Chiefs
Frank Akins, former NFL running back for Washington Redskins
Mike Akiu, football player
Josh Akognon, member of the Nigeria national basketball team
Calvin Armstrong, CFL offensive tackle for Edmonton Eskimos
Dominique Arnold, 1996, track & field NCAA champion; American record holder in 110m high hurdles (12.90)
Rick Austin, former Major League Baseball pitcher for Cleveland Indians and Milwaukee Brewers
Byron Bailey, former NFL running back for Detroit Lions and Green Bay Packers
LaVar Ball, former basketball and football player
Ed Barker, former NFL wide receiver for Pittsburgh Steelers and Washington Redskins
Norton Barnhill, former National Basketball Association (NBA) guard for Seattle SuperSonics
Kyle Basler, NFL punter for Cleveland Browns
Aron Baynes, NBA center for San Antonio Spurs; 2014 NBA champion
Pat Beach, former NFL tight end
Todd Belitz, former MLB pitcher
Leon Bender, drafted by Oakland Raiders in 1998, but died before playing an NFL game
Troy Bienemann, NFL tight end for Arizona Cardinals
Gale Bishop, former player for Philadelphia Warriors in BAA
Drew Bledsoe, 1993 B.A. educ., NFL quarterback with Dallas Cowboys, New England Patriots, Buffalo Bills; top pick of 1993 NFL Draft
Dorian Boose, former NFL defensive end for New York Jets and Washington Redskins
Ed Bouchee, former MLB first baseman for Philadelphia Phillies, Chicago Cubs and New York Mets
Adam Braidwood, first overall by Edmonton Eskimos in 2006 Canadian College Draft
Bob Bratkowski, current offensive coordinator for NFL's Cincinnati Bengals
Bobo Brayton, 1950 B.A. physical education, 1959 M.S. physical education, former WSU baseball coach
Ed Brett, former NFL defensive end
Alex Brink, NFL quarterback for Houston Texans
Steve Broussard, NFL running back and WSU assistant football coach
Mkristo Bruce, NFL defensive end for Jacksonville Jaguars
Deone Bucannon, NFL inside linebacker for Arizona Cardinals
Michael Bumpus, wide receiver with Seattle Seahawks
Joe Burks, former NFL center
Greg Burns, defensive backs coach for Kansas State University
Lewis Bush, former linebacker for San Diego Chargers and Kansas City Chiefs
Hugh Campbell, former head coach of Houston Oilers
Ron Cey, MLB third baseman, six-time All-Star; graduate of Mount Tahoma High School in Tacoma
Cliff Chambers, former MLB pitcher for the Chicago Cubs, Pittsburgh Pirates, and St. Louis Cardinals
John Chaplin, 1963 B.A. geography, WSU track & field coach, 2000 US Olympic coach
Gail Cogdill, NFL wide receiver, 3X Pro Bowl participant and 1960 NFL Rookie of the Year
Erik Coleman, defensive back for Atlanta Falcons
Don Collins, NBA player for Atlanta Hawks
Jed Collins, NFL fullback; signed with Philadelphia Eagles in 2008
Gene Conley, MLB All-Star and NBA player; first person to win championship in both sports
Joe Danelo, former NFL placekicker
Devard Darling, NFL wide receiver for Baltimore Ravens
James Darling, NFL middle linebacker for Arizona Cardinals
Jason David,  NFL cornerback for New Orleans Saints
Steve Dildine, linebacker for San Francisco 49ers
James Donaldson, former NBA center
Dan Doornink, former running back for New York Giants and Seattle Seahawks; practicing MD of internal medicine
Chad Eaton, former NFL defensive tackle and recipient of Morris Trophy
Dave Edler, former MLB third baseman for Seattle Mariners
Turk Edwards, former offensive tackle for Washington Redskins, member of Pro Football Hall of Fame
Craig Ehlo, former NBA player for Cleveland Cavaliers and Atlanta Hawks
Garner Ekstran, former CFL defensive end for Saskatchewan Roughriders, winner of 1966 Grey Cup
Jack Elway, football head coach at Stanford and San Jose State, father of Hall of Fame quarterback John Elway
Dick Farman, former offensive lineman and Pro Bowl selection for Washington Redskins
Mark Fields, former linebacker and Pro Bowl selection for New Orleans Saints and Carolina Panthers
Danielle Fisher, at 20, youngest person to summit tallest mountain on each continent (2005)
Isaac Fontaine, former NBA guard for Memphis Grizzlies
Eric Frampton, NFL safety for Oakland Raiders, Minnesota Vikings
Rodrigo de la Fuente, Spanish basketball player, formerly with FC Barcelona
Aaron Garcia, quarterback for New York Dragons of the Arena Football League
Jason Gesser, quarterback for Utah Blaze of Arena Football League
Steve Gleason, 1998 Pac-10 defensive MVP and special teams captain of New Orleans Saints; Congressional Gold Medal recipient.
Phil Glover, linebacker for Tampa Bay Storm
Ed Goddard, former All-American quarterback and NFL player
Kenny Graham, former AFL All-Star safety for San Diego Chargers
Dan Grayson, American gridiron football player
Brad Greenberg, current head men's basketball coach at Radford University
Ken Greene, former NFL safety for St. Louis Cardinals and San Diego Chargers
Jason Hanson, 1993 B.S., Zoo., longtime NFL placekicker for Detroit Lions
Glenn Harper, former CFL punter and winner of Grey Cup
Charles Harris, offensive lineman for Tennessee Titans
Tony Harris (1970–2007), pro basketball player
Jerome Harrison, former NCAA All-American and running back for Cleveland Browns
James Hasty, former Pro Bowl cornerback for Kansas City Chiefs
Scott Hatteberg, former MLB first baseman for Oakland Athletics and Cincinnati Reds
Chris Hayes, former defensive back and Super Bowl XXXI champion for Green Bay Packers
Mel Hein, 1931 B.S. physical education, All-American in 1930; eight-time All-Pro  with New York Giants; received WSU Regents' Distinguished Alumnus Award in 1983; member of Pro Football Hall of Fame
Mark Hendrickson, former NBA player and MLB pitcher for Los Angeles Dodgers
Jason Hill, NFL wide receiver for San Francisco 49ers
 Alex Hoffman-Ellis, football linebacker
Jerry Houghton, former NFL offensive tackle
Don Hover, former linebacker for Washington Redskins
Erik Howard, former defensive tackle and member of two Super Bowl championship teams
George Hurley, former offensive guard for Washington Redskins
 Ike Iroegbu (born 1995), American-born Nigerian basketball player for Hapoel Galil Elyon of the Israeli Basketball Premier League
Bernard Jackson, former NFL defensive back
Chris Jackson, wide receiver for AFL's Philadelphia Soul
Tim Jankovich, men's basketball head coach at Illinois State University
Eldon Jenne, former Olympic track and field athlete; head football and basketball coach at Pacific University
Brian Kelly, former wide receiver and member of Canadian Football Hall of Fame
Allan Kennedy, former NFL offensive tackle
Samson Kimobwa, retired distance runner from Kenya
Mike Kinkade, 2000 Olympic baseball gold medalist; played in Chicago Cubs organization
Peter Koech, 1988 Olympic silver medalist, 3,000m steeplechase
Julius Korir, 1984 Olympic steeplechase champion
Bernard Lagat, 2000, two-time Olympic track & field medalist in 1500m
Ryan Leaf, 1999 (1995–98), former NFL quarterback with San Diego Chargers; taken second in 1998 NFL Draft
Ron Lewis, former offensive guard for Washington Redskins
Keith Lincoln, former NFL running back; record 206 yards rushing in 1964 American Football League Championship Game for San Diego Chargers, two-time Pro Bowl MVP
Rian Lindell, kicker for the Buffalo Bills, Tampa Bay Buccaneers, Seattle Seahawks
Gerry Lindgren, won 11 NCAA track & field distance running championships
Chad Little, former NASCAR driver
Don Long, MLB hitting coach for Pittsburgh Pirates, Cincinnati Reds
Rien Long, 2003, only WSU player to win Outland Trophy, NFL defensive tackle for Tennessee Titans
Dan Lynch, former first-team AP All-American football lineman, 1984
John Marshall, defensive coordinator for Seattle Seahawks
Rueben Mayes, former NFL running back with New Orleans Saints
Rob Meier, former NFL defensive end for Jacksonville Jaguars
Keith Millard, former NFL defensive lineman
Gardner Minshew, NFL quarterback for the Jacksonville Jaguars, Philadelphia Eagles
Singor Mobley, former NFL safety for Dallas Cowboys
Tom Niedenfuer, former MLB relief pitcher for Los Angeles Dodgers
Laurie Niemi, former Pro Bowl offensive lineman for Washington Redskins
Paul Noce, former MLB shortstop for Chicago Cubs and Cincinnati Reds
John Olerud, former MLB first baseman for Toronto Blue Jays and Seattle Mariners
Karl Paymah, NFL cornerback for Denver Broncos
Scott Pelluer, former NFL linebacker for New Orleans Saints
Brian Quinnett, former NBA player for New York Knicks and Dallas Mavericks
Pete Rademacher, Olympic gold medalist for boxing in 1956
George Raveling, one of winningest coaches in WSU history, member of College Basketball Hall of Fame
Taylor Rochestie (born 1985) American-Montenegrin player for Hapoel Haifa of the Israel Basketball Premier League
Lisa Roman, Canadian Olympic gold medalist for rowing in Summer 2020, member of the WSU Hall of Fame
Henry Rono, former track & field world record holder in 10,000m, 5,000m, 3,000m, and 3,000m steeplechase
Timm Rosenbach, former NFL player with Phoenix Cardinals; quarterbacks coach for WSU 2003–07
Rob Ryan, former MLB outfielder for Arizona Diamondbacks and Oakland Athletics
Mark Rypien, former NFL quarterback, Super Bowl XXVI MVP with Washington Redskins
Herb Schmalenberger, former college football coach at UC Davis
Aaron Sele, former Major League Baseball pitcher
Doug Sisk, former MLB relief pitcher
Howie Slater, former NFL fullback
Jonathan McKenzi Smith, NFL running back for Kansas City Chiefs
Raonall Smith, former NFL outside linebacker for St. Louis Rams
Jack Spring, former MLB relief pitcher
Wes Stock, former MLB pitcher for Baltimore Orioles
Wayne Sutton, former head football coach at Louisiana State University
Harland Svare, former NFL player for the Los Angeles Rams and New York Giants; former head coach of the Rams and San Diego Chargers; former general manager of the Chargers.
Jack Thompson,  1984 Bus. Adm., former NFL quarterback known as "Throwin' Samoan"
Klay Thompson, four-time NBA champion Golden State Warriors shooting guard
Lamont Thompson, former All-American and NFL safety for Tennessee Titans
Robbie Tobeck, former Pro Bowl center for Seattle Seahawks
Marcus Trufant, 2003, first-round pick in 2003 NFL Draft; All-Pro cornerback for Seattle Seahawks
Mike Utley, former offensive lineman for Detroit Lions; became paralyzed during a game against Los Angeles Rams in 1991
Jeff Varem, pro basketball player
Ed Viesturs, 1987 D.V.M., one of 12 people in world and only American to climb 14 tallest mountains; unaided by supplemental oxygen
Ian Waltz, eight-time NCAA All-American for discus and shot put, 2004 US Olympian for discus
 Ashley Walyuchow, 1994, athletic director University of Houston-Victoria; Under Armour Athletic Director of the Year
Duke Washington, former running back for Philadelphia Eagles
Kyle Weaver, pro basketball player
Mike Wilson, former NFL wide receiver for San Francisco 49ers
Cory Withrow, NFL center for San Diego Chargers and Minnesota Vikings
Paul Wulff, former NCAA All-American and WSU football head coach

Notable faculty
Mario Vargas Llosa, recipient of 2010 Nobel Prize in literature, Visiting Faculty, 1968-69
Olusola Adesope, Boeing Distinguished Professor of STEM Education
James Asay, Institute of Shock Physics researcher; member of the National Academy of Engineering
LeRoy Ashby, regents professor of history; twice Washington Professor of the Year; author of With Amusement for All: A History of American Popular Culture Since 1830
Brett Atwood, print and online journalist; co-founder of Rolling Stone Radio; former managing editor at Amazon.com, RealNetworks and Billboard magazine 
Buck Bailey, WSU baseball coach
Josephine Thorndike Berry, head of the Department of Home Economics, State College of Washington
V. N. Bhatia, former WSU Honors Program director; Knight of Denmark, Dannebrog Order
Anjan Bose, electrical engineering professor and former dean; developed training simulators and computational tools for reliable power-system operation; member of the National Academy of Engineering
Asif J. Chaudhry, Vice President of International Programs, United States Ambassador to Moldova 2008–2011, also WSU Ag Econ PhD graduate 1988
Walter Clore, horticulture researcher; "father of the Washington wine industry"
Clint Cole, co-founder of Heartstream, creator of the first automatic external defibrillator (AED) for commercial use; co-founder of Digilent, a local Pullman electronics manufacturer
R. James Cook, plant pathologist, cropping systems and biotechnology researcher; led first field test of a genetically modified organism in the Pacific Northwest; member of the National Academy of Sciences
Alfred W. Crosby, professor of history 1966–1977; Crosby coined the term Columbian exchange in his 1972 book The Columbian Exchange. His is considered a founder of the field of environmental history.
Rodney Croteau, leader in biosynthesis of cancer-fighting Taxol; expert on terpenoids; member of the National Academy of Sciences
J. Thomas Dickinson, physicist, known for work in fracture, tribology and laser interactions with materials; Fellow of the American Association for the Advancement of Science
William Henry Dietz ("Lone Star Dietz"), WSU football coach; won first annual Rose Bowl; professional football coach
Don A. Dillman, sociologist; Regents Professor; Foley Distinguished Professor of Government and Public Policy; major contributor to modern survey methods; past president of the American Association of Public Opinion Research; Fellow of the American Association for the Advancement of Science
Elson S. Floyd, professor of Higher Education Administration; president of Washington State University
Roald H. Fryxell, WSU professor of geoarchaeology in the Department of Anthropology; namesake of the Fryxell crater on the Moon 
Norman S. Golding, food scientist, inventor of Cougar Gold cheese
Jeffrey Gramlich, professor of accounting
Yogendra Gupta, physicist, director of WSU Institute for Shock Physics; Fellow of the American Physical Society and the American Association for the Advancement of Science
John Hirth, mechanical and materials engineer; characterized and modeled the behavior of materials at atomic and microstructural levels, including thin film formation useful to the semiconductor industry; member of the National Academy of Engineering
Alexander Kuo, humanities and creative writing professor; author; writer-in-residence
Mark G. Kuzyk, physicist, discoverer of the Kuzyk limit and the Kuzyk quantum gap
Kelvin Lynn, materials scientist, renowned for "positron annihilation" research; Fellow of the American Association for the Advancement of Science
John M. Madsen, former dean and general authority of the Church of Jesus Christ of Latter-day Saints
Amy Mazur, Claudius O. and Mary W. Johnson Distinguished Professor in Political Science
Frances K. McSweeney, psychologist known for work on behavior and reinforcement, with findings on short-term changes in reinforcer effectiveness; WSU Meyer Distinguished Professor of Psychology; Fellow of the Association for Behavior Analysis
Sue Peabody, Meyer Distinguished Professor of history
Charles Pezeshki (Dr. Chuck), WSU professor of mechanical and materials engineering, 1998–present; past chair of the University Faculty Senate; founder and director of the Industrial Design Clinic
Bhakta B. Rath, assistant professor of metallurgy and material Science; material physicist; head of the Materials Science and Component Technology of the United States Naval Research Laboratory
V. Lane Rawlins, professor of economics and WSU president emeritus
Cecilia Richards - mechanical engineer, known for her work on small-scale heat engines and on microelectromechanical systems
Clarence A. "Bud" Ryan Jr., isolated and synthesized systemin, first polypeptide hormone found in plants, and discovered that plants produce natural insecticides in response to pest attacks; member of the National Academy of Sciences
Michael Skinner, molecular and reproduction biologist; made discoveries in epigenetics including reduction in male fertility for four generations; his findings appeared in Discover magazine's "100 top science stories of 2005" 
Samuel H. Smith, WSU President Emeritus; former NATO post-doctoral fellow
William Jasper Spillman, WSU professor of agriculture; wheat breeder; independently rediscovered Mendel's Law of Heredity; "father of agricultural economics
Clyfford Still, abstract expressionist painter, Clyfford Still Museum, Denver
Matthew Avery Sutton, WSU Professor of History. Scholar of American Evangelism.
Orville Vogel, WSU and USDA wheat breeder; developer of semi-dwarf wheat varieties that fueled the Green Revolution; recipient of the National Medal of Science
Diter von Wettstein, plant geneticist; internationally recognized for genetically modifying barley for brewing processes and disease resistance; National Academy of Sciences foreign associate; member of the Royal Danish Academy of Sciences
Allen I. White, WSU professor of pharmacy faculty 1940–1960; dean of the WSU College of Pharmacy 1960–1979; pioneered off-campus training for the college7
Susmita Bose, Notable Indian-American Scientist and Herman and Brita Lindholm Endowed Chair Professor in the School of Mechanical and Materials Engineering at Washington State University.

Notable regents
Frances Penrose Owen, first woman on the WSU Board of Regents, serving 1957–1975

References

Washington State University people